Turkey participated in the Eurovision Song Contest 2007 with the song "Shake It Up Şekerim" written and performed by Kenan Doğulu. The entry was selected through an internal selection organised by Turkish broadcaster Türkiye Radyo ve Televizyon Kurumu (TRT).

Before Eurovision

Internal selection 
On 19 December 2006, TRT announced during a press conference that singer Kenan Doğulu had been internally selected to represent Turkey in Helsinki. Prior to the announcement of Doğulu as the Turkish representative, rumoured artists in Turkish media included maNga, Murat Boz, Mor ve Ötesi, Nil Karaibrahimgli, Şebnem Ferah, Yüksek Sadakat and Zerrin Özer. Three songs were submitted by Doğulu to the broadcaster in February 2007 and a five-member selection committee consisting of Ali Güney (TRT general manager), Muhsin Mete (TRT deputy general manager), Deniz Çakmakoğlu (TRT deputy head of music), Muhsin Yıldırım (Ankara Television director) and Doğulu selected "Shake It Up Şekerim" as the song he would perform at the contest.

On 9 March 2007, "Shake It Up Şekerim" was presented to the public along with the official music video during a press conference that took place at the TRT Tepebaşı Studios in Istanbul, broadcast on TRT 1 as well as online via the broadcaster's official website trt.net.tr. The song was written by Kenan Doğulu himself. In regards to the song, Doğulu stated that a total of nine songs, which he loved a lot, were written for the contest: "It was very difficult to shorten the list to three songs. We have chosen a cheerful up-tempo song. May it bring us luck".

Promotion 
Doğulu toured several countries in order to drum up support for his Eurovision entry including some countries who are known for not voting for Turkey that often. These countries include Russia, Cyprus, Estonia and some others.

At Eurovision

Because Turkey placed 11th at the 2006 contest, country was forced to compete in the Eurovision semi-final, Turkey performed 26th in the running order, following Slovenia and preceding Austria. Kenan qualified from 3rd place with 198 points. In the final he performed 22nd in running order following Bulgaria and preceding Armenia. At the close of voting "Shake It Up Şekerim" had received 163 points (including a maximum 12 from Belgium, France, Germany, Netherlands, United Kingdom) placing Turkey 4th of the 24 entries.

Voting

Points awarded to Turkey

Points awarded by Turkey

References

2007
Countries in the Eurovision Song Contest 2007
Eurovision